The Pedersen index is a measure of electoral volatility in party systems.  It was described by Mogens Pedersen in a paper published in 1979 entitled  The Dynamics of European Party Systems: Changing Patterns of Electoral Volatility.

What the index means
"The net change within the electoral party system resulting from individual vote transfers"

Construction of the Index
The Pedersen index is calculated as 

   

To calculate the index, the percentage gains of the winning parties must be determined. The resulting index will be between 0 (no parties gained, and thus no parties lost either) and 100 (all the parties from the last election were reduced to zero votes), because for every gain there is an equal (in terms of percentage of votes) loss. In other words, the index is equal to the net percentage of voters who changed their votes. ("Net percentage," because if the only change is a Party A voter switching to Party B, and a Party B voter switching to Party A, there is no net volatility.)
The index can also be constructed by summing the absolute values of all gains and all losses, and dividing this total by two.

Example
Assume that in the first election the Blue Party won 65%, the Orange Party won 25%, and the Fuchsia Party won 10%. Furthermore, assume that in the second election the Blue Party won 65%, the Orange Party won 15%, and the Fuchsia Party won 20%.

The index would be equal to Blue gains (none) plus Orange's loss (10% since we do not consider sign differences) plus Fuchsia gains (10%). We then multiply it by 1/2 or divide by 2 for a total volatility of 10%.

If all three parties had disappeared in the next election, and been replaced by the Red Party (75%) and the Black Party (25%), the volatility would have been 100%: The first three lose all (100%) + the Red Party gaining 75% and the Black Party 25% since the previous election (when they both received no votes.) 100+100 = 200  -> divide by 2 = 100

Countries 
The Pedersen indices for individual countries are listed below, only the last available index is shown. The Pedersen index tends to decrease for some countries with increasing number of consecutive elections.

References

Political science theories